Manchamanteles (literally, "tablecloth stainer") in Mexican cuisine, is a stew of assorted meat, chili peppers, vegetables, and fruits. A typical recipe for mancha manteles contains chicken and/or pork, chorizo, pineapple, apple, banana,  chili peppers, almonds, cinnamon, lard and tomatoes.

See also
 List of Mexican dishes

References

Mexican stews
Chili pepper dishes
Meat dishes
Pineapple dishes
Sausage dishes
Banana dishes